Robert Dome may refer to:
 Róbert Döme, Slovak ice hockey player
Robert B. Dome (1905–1996), American electrical engineer